Neely Gray (February 25, 1810 – May 15, 1867) was an American businessman and politician.

Born in what is now Brooke County, West Virginia, Gray moved to Pennsylvania and worked as a millwright. In 1835, Gray moved to Platteville, Michigan Territory. He served in the Wisconsin Territorial House of Representatives in 1840 and 1842 as a Whig. He then served in the first Wisconsin Constitutional Convention of 1846. After going to California for a brief time, Gray settled in Madison, Wisconsin, where he had a storage and commission business and later a coal yard. In 1866, he served on the Dane County, Wisconsin Board of Supervisors, but resigned due to ill health. Gray died in Madison, Wisconsin.

References

External links

1810 births
1867 deaths
People from Brooke County, West Virginia
People from Platteville, Wisconsin
Politicians from Madison, Wisconsin
Businesspeople from Madison, Wisconsin
County supervisors in Wisconsin
Members of the Wisconsin Territorial Legislature
19th-century American politicians
19th-century American businesspeople